Vasco Vascotto (born 10 October 1969) is an Italian sailor who has won 25 World Championships titles which is believed to be the most of any sailor. Although he started as a dinghy sailor his professional career has focused on yachts. He won the Admirals Cup in 1999 and then sailed with Mascalzone Latino as skipper and tactician competing in the Louis Vuitton Cup 2007 the challenger series for the America's Cup.

Known World Championships titles are as follows:

References

External links
 

1969 births
Living people
Vascotto Vasco
J/24 class world champions
Farr 40 class world champions
RC44 class world champions
TP52 class world champions
World champions in sailing for Italy
2007 America's Cup sailors
2021 America's Cup sailors